Rex International Holding is an oil and gas company headquartered in Singapore. The company's main activity is in offshore oil and gas exploration and production in assets located in Oman and Norway.

The company owns Rex Virtual Drilling, which is developed by its Swedish founders. Rex Virtual Drilling is a liquid hydrocarbon indicator that studies resonance information in seismic data, using unique algorithms that create 3D maps that show any correlation with the presence of oil in the ground.

Rex International Holding has achieved four offshore oil discoveries since its listing in July 2013; one in Oman and three in Norway.

Rex International was publicly listed on 31 July 2013 and is on Singapore Exchange's secondary board, Catalyst.

History

The Company was founded by Karl Lidgren, Hans Lidgen and Svein Kjellesvik. The three then founded Rex Partners, whose subsidiary Rex Commercial and Schroders & Co Bank AG were the initial shareholders of Rex International Holding, a private company incorporated in Singapore on 11 January 2013. The Company's current focus is on its offshore assets in Norway and Oman, operated by its subsidiaries, Lime Petroleum AS and Masirah Oil Limited respectively.

31 July 2013: Rex International Holding was listed on the Singapore Exchange Securities Trading Limited’s (SGX-ST) Catalyst Board. It is one of the largest company listed on the Catalyst Board.

4 February 2014, an oil discovery was announced in Block 50 Oman. The second exploration well that was drilled in the concession had successfully reached a good target depth of more than 3,000m into the Cambrian formation. Hydrocarbons were discovered in several formations with good oil samples extracted.

On 12 December 2014, the company acquired 100% shareholding interest in Rex Technology Management, owner of a suite of Rex Technologies. The acquisition alleviates concerns the investors had and also allowed the Company to hold its key differentiator – Rex Technologies, in the listed entity.

On 27 August 2018, the company started the drilling and production testing of the Rolvsnes oil discovery in PL338C, in which Rex’s 90 percent subsidiary Lime Petroleum AS holds a 30 percent interest, was completed successfully with a production rate of up to 7,000 barrels of oil per day (bopd), confirming sustainable commercial oil flow.

On 29 May 2019, Lime Petroleum AS completed the divestment of its 30 per cent interests in the Rolvsnes discovery in PL338C, PL338E and its 20 per cent interest in the Goddo prospect in PL815 in Norway for a total consideration of US$45 million.

On 16 October 2019, Lime Petroleum AS participated (30 percent) in the exploration drilling of the Shrek prospect, which was completed as an oil and gas discovery estimated by the operator to have between 19 and 38 million barrels of recoverable oil equivalents. The partners in the licence would consider tying the discovery into the Skarv facility.

17 February 2020: The Yumna 1 well has tested at a production rate of 11,843 stock tank barrels of oil per day through a 1-inch choke, with a crude oil gravity of 42 degrees API.

12 July 2020: The Ministry of Oil and Gas in Oman approved the Field Development Plan for the Yumna Field and awarded a Declaration of Commerciality.

2 November 2020: Lime Petroleum AS participated (20%) in the drilling of the Apollonia prospect in PL263D/E, which results in a gas discovery.

23 January 2021: Yumna 2 in Block 50 Oman commenced production, at a stabilized rate of 9,000 stb/d of oil.

18 February 2021: Yumna 3 in Block 50 Oman commenced production, testing at a rate of 12,984 stb/d of oil on natural flow through an 80/64” choke.

17 March 2021: Masirah Oil Limited announced the completion of the upgrade to the Yumna Field process facilities, which has more than doubled the liquid handling capacity on the Mobile Offshore Production Unit (MOPU) to 30,000 barrels per day.

7 April 2021: Lime Petroleum AS signed an agreement with ONE-Dyas Norge AS (“ONE-Dyas”) to swap its 20 percent interests in each of the licenses PL263D, PL263E, and PL263F Sierra (previously known as Apollonia) in the Norwegian Sea for ONE-Dyas’ 13.3 percent interest in PL433 Fogelberg. The transfer of the interests is pending regulatory approval.

Technologies

Dr. Karl Lidgren and Mr. Hans Lidgen, two of the three founders of Rex International Holding developed Rex Technologies. The proprietary exploration technologies have the ability to predict the location of liquid hydrocarbons.

 Rex Virtual Drilling is used to detect liquid hydrocarbon accumulations using seismic data interpretation techniques.9 February 2015: The Company announced that it had developed an improved version of Rex Virtual Drilling. This second-generation RVD has improved depth resolution in the analysis of seismic data. This allows for correlation with conventional geological studies. The technology has since been enhanced with added features such as dispersion analysis for further accuracy and data processing optimisation. 
 Rex Gravity, is an exploration technology that finds areas with suitable geological conditions for hydrocarbon accumulations.
Rex Seepage, works together with Rex Gravity. Rex Seepage was developed to spot offshore oil seepages in order to better understand the potential presence of oil reservoirs.

Operations

The Company’s current focus is on offshore assets in Norway and Oman, operated by the Company's subsidiaries, Lime Petroleum AS and Masirah Oil Limited respectively.

Norway

One of the main areas of focus for the Company is Norway as it is a matured market with high activity with reputed operators, attractive fiscal policies and good quality seismic data to be analyzed with Rex Virtual Drilling. A lot of Norway’s oil production occurs in the North Sea and smaller amounts in the Norwegian Sea. In recent times, new exploration and production activity is occurring in the Barents Sea.

Oman 
Oman is the largest oil producer in the Middle East that is not part of OPEC. According to the US Energy Information Administration (EIA), Oman had 5.5 billion barrels of estimated proved oil reserves as of January 2014. Oman’s 5.5 billion barrels of proved oil reserves rank seventh in the Middle East and 23rd in the world. Located in the East of the Gulf of Masirah, Block 50 Oman is one of the first concessions secured by the founders of Rex International before IPO. The discovery is significant as it is the first offshore discovery in the area after 30 years of exploration activity. Block 50 spans approximately 17,000 km2  This discovery won Masirah Oil, the Offshore Discovery of the Year award for discovering hydrocarbons in its second offshore exploration well in Block 50 Oman.

References

Energy companies established in 2013
Companies listed on the Singapore Exchange